The FIFA Club World Cup is an international association football competition organised by the FIFA, the sport's global governing body. It is the replacement or continuation of the Intercontinental Cup. The championship was first contested as the FIFA Club World Championship in 2000. It was not held between 2001 and 2004 due to a combination of factors, most importantly the collapse of FIFA's marketing partner International Sport and Leisure. Following a change in format which saw the FIFA Club World Championship absorb the Intercontinental Cup, it was relaunched in 2005 and took its current name the season afterwards.

The current format of the tournament involves seven teams competing for the title at venues within the host nation over a period of about two weeks; the winners of that year's edition of the Asian AFC Champions League, African CAF Champions League, North American CONCACAF Champions League, South American Copa Libertadores, Oceanian OFC Champions League and European UEFA Champions League, along with the host nation's national champion, participate in a straight knockout tournament.

Real Madrid holds the record for most victories, winning the competition five times since its inception. Teams from Spain have won the tournament the most times, with eight wins produced from that nation. The Union of European Football Associations (UEFA) is the most successful confederation of the competition with fifteen titles earned by eight of its clubs. 

The current champions are Real Madrid, who won their fifth title following a 5–3 win against Al-Hilal in the 2022 final, held at the Prince Moulay Abdellah Stadium in Rabat, Morocco.

History

The first final of the competition was an all-Brazilian affair, as well as the only one which saw one side have home advantage. Vasco da Gama could not take advantage of its local support, being beaten by Corinthians 4–3 on penalties after a 0–0 draw in extra time. The second edition of the competition was planned for Spain in 2001, and was supposed to feature twelve clubs. However, it was canceled on 18 May, due to a combination of factors, most importantly the collapse of FIFA's marketing partner International Sport and Leisure. FIFA agreed with Toyota to merge the Toyota Cup and Club World Championship into one event.

The 2005 edition saw Brazilian club São Paulo pushed to the limit by Saudi side Al-Ittihad to reach the final. In the final, one goal from Mineiro was enough to dispatch English club Liverpool; Mineiro became the first player to score in a Club World Cup final. Internacional defeated defending world and South American champions São Paulo in the 2006 Copa Libertadores Finals in order to qualify for the 2006 tournament. In the semi-finals, Internacional beat Egyptian side Al Ahly, qualifying for the final against Barcelona from Spain. One late goal from Adriano Gabiru allowed the trophy to be kept in Brazil once again.

It was in 2007 when Brazilian hegemony was finally broken; Italian side Milan disputed a close match against Japan's Urawa Red Diamonds, who were pushed by over 67,000 fans at Yokohama's International Stadium, and won 1–0 to reach the final. In the final, Milan defeated Argentine side Boca Juniors 4–2, in a match that saw the first player to be sent off in a Club World Cup final, Milan's Kakha Kaladze from Georgia, in the 77th minute. Eleven minutes later, Boca Juniors' Pablo Ledesma would join Kaladze as he too was sent off. The following year, Manchester United would emulate Milan by beating their semi-final opponents, Japan's Gamba Osaka, 5–3. They saw off Ecuadorian club LDU Quito 1–0 in the final, as the English side became the second European team to win the tournament.

Barcelona dethroned world and European champions Manchester United in the 2009 UEFA Champions League Final to qualify for the 2009 edition of the Club World Cup. Barcelona defeated Mexican club Atlante 3–1 in the semi-finals and met Estudiantes from Argentina in the final. After a very close encounter which saw the need for extra time, Lionel Messi scored from a header to snatch victory for Barcelona and complete an unprecedented sextuple (six trophies in a calendar year). The 2010 edition saw the first non-European and non-South American side to reach the final: Congo's Mazembe defeated Brazil's Internacional 2–0 in the semi-finals to set up a final with Italian Internazionale, who had beaten South Korean club Seongnam Ilhwa Chunma 3–0. Internazionale would go on to beat Mazembe by the same scoreline to win their fifth title of the year.

In 2011, Barcelona would once again show its class after winning their semi-final match 4–0 against Qatari club Al-Sadd. In the final, Barcelona would win by the same scoreline against Brazilian side Santos; this is, to date, the largest final winning margin by any victor of the competition. The 2012 edition saw Europe's dominance come to an end, as Corinthians traveled to Japan to join Barcelona in becoming two-time winners of the competition. In the semi-finals, Al Ahly managed to keep the scoreline close as Corinthians' Paolo Guerrero scored to send the Timão into their second final. Guerrero would once again come through for Corinthians in the final as the Timão saw off English side Chelsea 1–0 in order to bring the trophy back to Brazil.

List of finals
The International Stadium Yokohama in Japan has played host to the FIFA Club World Cup final the most times, with six title-deciding matches held. Along with the Estádio do Maracanã, they are the only venues in the world to have hosted both the FIFA World Cup final and the FIFA Club World Cup final (International Stadium Yokohama hosted the 2002 FIFA World Cup Final while the deciding match of the 1950 FIFA World Cup was disputed at the Maracanã). The 2000 FIFA Club World Championship Final remains the highest attended final of the competition, with 73,000 fans attending the all-Brazilian match. The final was also the only one which saw two clubs from the same nation dispute it. The 2021 final had the fewest spectators, with 32,871 (not including the 2020 final, which had restricted seating due to the COVID-19 pandemic).

The 2007 final holds the record for most goals scored in regulation in a Club World Cup Final, with six goals scored by five players, while the 2000 final remains the only scoreless decider. The 2011 final became the most lopsided match of the competition, with the triumphant team winning by a difference of four goals.

 Footnotes

Statistics

Results by club

Real Madrid holds the record number of victories in the competition with five. Corinthians remain the only club World Champion to have qualified to the competition by being the host nation's national champion.

Results by nation
Spain's La Liga is the most successful national league of the competition, with eight titles won. Brazil's Brasileirão has four titles, while England's Premier League is third with three titles. Italy's Serie A and Germany's Bundesliga are fourth with two titles each. Serie A and the Bundesliga remain the only undefeated national leagues which have had representatives play in the competition. Argentina's Primera División carries the dubious honour of losing the most finals without ever winning the world title, with four defeats.

Results by confederation

Results by manager

See also
 List of Intercontinental Cup (football) winners

References

External links
  
  

finals
FIFA Club World Cup